Francesco Grimaldi, called  (from Italian: "the malicious"), was the Genoese leader of the Guelphs who captured the Rock of Monaco on the night of 8 January 1297. He was the son of Guglielmo Grimaldi by his wife Giacobina or Giacoba, a Genoese noble.

Capture of Monaco
Dressed as a Franciscan friar, Francesco was greeted at the gates of Monaco's castle, only then to seize the castle with his cousin Rainier I, Lord of Cagnes, and a group of men behind him. The event is commemorated on the Monegasque coat of arms, on which the supporters are two friars armed with swords. He held the citadel of Monaco for four years before being chased out by the Genoese. The battle over "the rock" was taken over by his kinsmen. Francesco thus failed to establish Grimaldi's rule over Monaco, but was the first to attempt to do so.

Family
He was married in 1295 to Aurelia del Carretto; the marriage was childless. The modern Grimaldis are therefore not descendants of Francesco. After his death, in 1309, he was succeeded by his cousin (and stepson), Rainier I of Monaco, Lord of Cagnes.

His cousin's descendants, the Grimaldi family, still rule Monaco today. Over one hundred years after the coup, the Grimaldis purchased Monaco from the crown of Aragon in 1419, and became the official and undisputed rulers of "the Rock of Monaco". Rainier Il's three sons-Ambroise, Antoine and Jean purchased Monaco in the name of Grimaldi from its then owner, Queen Yolande of Aragon.

References

Françoise de Bernardy, Princes of Monaco: the remarkable history of the Grimaldi family, ed. Barker, 1961.

External links

13th-century births
1309 deaths
13th-century rulers of Monaco
14th-century rulers of Monaco
13th-century Genoese people
14th-century Genoese people
Francois
History of Monaco
Year of birth unknown
Place of birth missing
Wars of the Guelphs and Ghibellines